The women's 400 metres event at the 2009 Asian Athletics Championships was held at the Guangdong Olympic Stadium on November 10–11.

Medalists

Results

Heats

Final

References
Results

2009 Asian Athletics Championships
400 metres at the Asian Athletics Championships
2009 in women's athletics